Kaoh Andaet District is a district located in Takeo Province, in southern Cambodia. According to the 1998 census of Cambodia, it had a population of 45,650.

Administration
As of 2019, Kaoh Andaet District has 6 communes, 68 villages.

References 

 
Districts of Takéo province